Dong Xiaowan (1624–1651), also known as Dong Bai, was a Chinese courtesan, poet and writer, also known by her pen name Qinglian.

Dong has been described as the most famous courtesan of her time, known for her beauty and talent in singing, acting, needlework and the tea ceremony. She lived in the brothel district of Nanjing. Similar to other courtesans of the late Ming Dynasty, Dong's moral qualities were emphasised among her admirers more than her talents.

She is one of the Eight Beauties of Qinhuai described by late Qing officials. The other famed courtesans of this group are Ma Xianglan, Bian Yujing, Li Xiangjun, Liu Rushi, Gu Mei, Kou Baimen, and Chen Yuanyuan.

Marriage
Dong's mother died in 1642, leaving her to struggle financially.  The noble Mao Bijiang, alternatively known as Mao Xiang, had attempted to meet with Dong several times, but had pursued a relationship with the courtesan Chen Yuanyuan instead. After Chen was abducted by a noble associated with the imperial court, Mao visited Dong. Her mother had been dead for two weeks and Dong was quite ill. She proposed that she become his concubine and, refusing to take no for an answer, allegedly followed him for 27 days on his boat. Eventually, the two agreed to wait for Mao to pass the imperial examinations, which he failed. In order to facilitate Dong's marriage, Qian Qianyi, husband of fellow courtesan Liu Rushi, paid off her debts of 3,000 gold taels and had her name struck from the musicians' register. She then lived with Mao in Rugao as his concubine, alongside his wife Lady Su.

She has been described as an ideal dutiful, sacrificing and loyal wife and daughter-in-law during her marriage to Mao Bijiang, who as a loyalist of the Ming dynasty was persecuted after the Qing dynasty's rise to power in 1644. When Mao, Lady Su and Dong were forced to flee their home in 1644, Dong abandoned her more valuable belongings to save her writings and paintings. They stayed in Huzhou until Zhu Yousong was crowned emperor in Nanjing later in 1644. Soon after, the household moved to Zhejiang, where Dong compiled a book titled Liuyan ji about jewellery, women's costumes, pavilions and parties.

Poetry
Dong wrote shi and was part of the new literati movement that focussed on emotions and the motif of the heartbroken lover. The poem below demonstrates a popular emotion, melancholy, focussing on a solitary woman in secluded female quarters.

Legacy
After her death, Mao Bijiang published a biography of Dong's life . It was translated into English and published in 1931. In it, he emphasised Dong's skill at needlework; a skill typically associated with the domestic virtues of a wife. In contrast, he downplayed her painting abilities, which Jean Wetzel has suggested may have been an attempt to disassociate Dong from her previous life as a courtesan.

Dong has often been confused with Consort Donggo, and therefore said to have been abducted to the harem of the Emperor.

Dong's life was adapted for film by Cantonese opera playwright Tang Ti-sheng, with Fong Yim Fun portraying Dong. Her romance with Mao Bijiang has been dramatised as a Kunqu opera by the Northern Kunqu Opera Theatre.

References

Notes

Works cited

External links
Dong Bai in the Ming Qing Women's Writings Database

1624 births
1651 deaths
17th-century Chinese people
Chinese women poets
Poets from Jiangsu
Ming dynasty poets
Writers from Nanjing
Qing dynasty poets
17th-century Chinese women
Eight Beauties of Qinhuai
Chinese concubines
17th-century Chinese actresses
17th-century Chinese women singers